Winkelhaid station is a railway station in the municipality of Winkelhaid, located in the Nürnberger Land district in Middle Franconia, Germany. The station is on the Feucht–Altdorf line of Deutsche Bahn.

References

Nuremberg S-Bahn stations
Railway stations in Bavaria
Buildings and structures in Nürnberger Land